Ibrahim Youssouf Ibrahim Izziddin (born December 3, 1934) is a retired Jordanian Ambassador.

Career
From 1955 to 1958 he was employed in the Ministry of Communication, Prime Ministers Office and Press Section of Ministry of Foreign Affairs.
From 1958 to 1965 he was deputy director of Book Publishers, Beirut.
From 1965 to 1968 he was  director of foreign Press in the ministry of Information.
From 1968 to 1970 he was Press Secretary of Hussein of Jordan.
From 1970 to 1971 he was director of public Relations of Royal Jordanian.
From 1971 to 1975 he was Under Secretary of the ministry of Information . 
From 25.03.1975 to April 22, 1977 he was ambassador in Bern (Switzerland).
From April 22, 1977 to 1978 he was ambassador in Bonn (Germany).
From 1978 to 1983 he was ambassador in London (United Kingdom).
 On June 29, 1983 he was appointed ambassador in Washington, D.C. where he was accredited on May 22, 1985 to serve as president of the Civil Service Commission in Amman.
In 2002 he was appointed director General of the Shoman Foundation.
In 2006 he was appointed President of the Higher Media Council of Jordan.

References

1934 births
Living people
Ambassadors of Jordan to Switzerland
Ambassadors of Jordan to Germany
Ambassadors of Jordan to the United Kingdom
Ambassadors of Jordan to the United States